Penicillium tsitsikammaense is a species of fungus in the genus Penicillium which was isolated from forest soil from the Tsitsikama forest near Knysna in the Cape Province in South Africa.

References

tsitsikammaense
Fungi described in 2014